El(l)iot(t) Brown(e) may refer to:

Elliot Brown (actor) (born 1991), English actor
Elliott Browne (cricketer) (1847–1915), English cricketer
Elliott Browne (gymnast) (born 1997), British trampoline gymnast
Elliott R. Brown, American physicist